Entre visillos (English: Behind the Curtains) is the first novel of the late Spanish writer Carmen Martín Gaite, who was from Salamanca. Published in 1957, it is considered one of the author's most important works, and it won the Premio Nadal in 1957. In a list published by the Spanish newspaper El Mundo, it was considered one of the best 100 Spanish novels of the 20th century.

Plot 
Through seemingly trivial conversations among a group of young women, the tedium and emptiness of their lives is revealed. The plot centers on the arrival of Pablo Klein to the city to teach German at the high school, as his personality conflicts with the flat and conformist atmosphere that encloses the lives of the young women.

References 

1957 novels
20th-century Spanish novels
Spanish-language novels